The National Intercollegiate Flying Association (NIFA) is a professional organization that provides a forum of competition and learning for aviation students from colleges all around the United States.

Official NIFA Mission Statement "The National Intercollegiate Flying Association was formed for the purposes of developing and advancing aviation education; to promote, encourage and foster safety in aviation; to promote and foster communications and cooperation between aviation students, educators, educational institutions and the aviation industry; and to provide an arena for collegiate aviation competition."

National championships

Current member clubs and schools 

 
Region I – (CO, ID, MT, NM, UT, and WY)
Colorado Northwestern Community College
Metropolitan State University of Denver
Rocky Mountain College
United States Air Force Academy
Utah State University
Utah Valley University
Westminster College

Region II – (AK, AZ, CA, HI, NV, OR, and WA)
Cochise College
Cypress College
Embry–Riddle Aeronautical University, Prescott
Mt. San Antonio College
Orange Coast College
San Diego Christian College
San Diego Miramar College
San Jose State University

Region III – (MI, OH, PA, and WV)
Bowling Green State University
Kent State University
Ohio University
Sinclair Community College
Ohio State University
University of Cincinnati Clermont College
Western Michigan University
 
Region IV – (AR, LA, MS, and TX)
Central Texas College
Delta State University
Hinds Community College
Louisiana Tech University
LeTourneau University
Southeastern Oklahoma State University
Texas State Technical College – Waco
University of Louisiana at Monroe

Region V – (IA, MN, ND, SD, and WI)
Iowa State University
Minnesota State University, Mankato
University of Dubuque
University of North Dakota
University of Wisconsin–Madison

Region VI – (KS, MO, NE, and OK)
Kansas State University Polytechnic Campus
Oklahoma State University–Stillwater
Saint Louis University
Spartan College of Aeronautics and Technology
Southeastern Oklahoma State University
University of Central Missouri
University of Nebraska Omaha
University of Oklahoma

Region VII – (CT, DE, ME, MA, NH, NJ, NY, RI, and VT)
Bridgewater State University
Delaware State University
Dowling College
Farmingdale State College
Rensselaer Polytechnic Institute
Schenectady County Community College
United States Coast Guard Academy
United States Military Academy

Region VIII – (IL, IN, KY and TN)
Indiana State University
Lewis University
Middle Tennessee State University
Purdue University
Quincy University
Southern Illinois University Carbondale

Region IX – (AL, FL, and GA)
Auburn University
Broward College
Embry–Riddle Aeronautical University, Daytona Beach
Florida Institute of Technology
Florida Memorial University
Jacksonville University
Lynn University
Miami Dade College
Polk State College

Region X – (DC, MD, NC, SC, and VA)
Averett University
Elizabeth City State University
Caldwell Community College & Technical Institute
Guilford Technical Community College
Hampton University
Liberty University
United States Naval Academy

External links 
 NIFA Website

References

Aviation organizations based in the United States
Aviation competitions and awards
Organizations based in Columbus, Ohio
Student organizations in the United States